The Narcotics Control Act 1990 is a Bangladeshi law that regulates narcotics including production, distribution, transaction, possession, transportation, cultivation, etc. The act was passed in 1990.

History
The Narcotics act was passed in 1990 by the Parliament of Bangladesh. It repealed the previous laws, the Opium Act of 1878, the Excise Act of 1909, the Dangerous Drugs Act of 1930, the Opium Smoking Act of 1932 and the Prohibition Rules of 1950. The government added amendments to the act in 2000, 2002, and 2004. The act came into force on 2 January 1990. The act made the  Department of Narcotics Control the central agency of the government drug police. The act made the National Narcotics Control Board the highest government body responsible for Narcotics control policy in Bangladesh. Department of Narcotics Control was established on 2 January 1990. In 2018 the government created a draft Narcotics Control Act 2018 to modernize the Narcotics Control Act 1990.

References

1990 in Bangladesh law
Drugs in Bangladesh
1990 in law
1990 in Bangladesh